Instituto México de B.C. is a private Catholic Elementary, Junior and High School located in the city of Tijuana, Mexico.

History 

Instituto México de Tijuana, B.C. is a civil association, founded on June 13, 1963. The school started operating on September 6, 1965. It had a total of 204 students (boys only) spanning from the 3rd to the 6th grade. For the next seven years the school continued to expand until it included 12 grades (1st to 12th grade). In 1973 the school added its first generation of Co-ed High School (10th-12th grade), "Bachillerato" (Preparatoria).

Status 

In 2008 the Mexican federal government applied a test to alumni of all schools in the country (totalling 13 million students) to measure level of knowledge and abilities, and according to the results Insituto México ranked 30th in the country and 1st in the state (Baja California).

Teachers

Instituto Mexico de Baja California, has many reputable teachers, mainly because of their unique way of teaching.
Some of them are:

- FMS Francisco Casanova Inchaurregi

A professor beloved by his students because of his unique way of giving class, especially Spanish class. He was also a reputable teacher from Instituto Valladolid Morelia, having been the teacher of Felipe Calderon Hinojosa (Former President of Mexico). He has instilled in his students a love of Opera and Bradbury. He is not currently teaching in the institution because of health problems. He's currently in Guadalajara at the Marcelino House, in the Universidad Marista De Guadalajara, also known as, Cervantes Loma Bonita.

References 
 http://www.imbc.com.mx/imbc/contenido.cfm?cont=PRINCIPAL
 http://www.enlace.sep.gob.mx/gr/

Schools in Mexico